Payton Wilson  is an American college football outside linebacker for the NC State Wolfpack.

Early life and high school career
Wilson grew up in Hillsborough, North Carolina and attended Orange High School. As a junior, he made 127 tackles with 39 tackles for loss and 13 sacks. Wilson also won the state 220-pound 3A wrestling championship during his junior year. He had 103 tackles, 21 tackles for loss, and 10 sacks before tearing his ACL during his senior year. Wilson was rated a four-star recruit and initially committed to play college football at North Carolina (UNC) over offers from Clemson, Ohio State, and Virginia Tech. He later de-committed from UNC and ultimately signed to play at North Carolina State.

College career
Wilson suffered a second knee injury during summer training camp and redshirted his true freshman season at NC State. He led the Wolfpack with 69 tackles during his redshirt freshman season. Wilson made 108 tackles with 11.5 tackles for loss, 3.5 sacks, and two interceptions and was named first team All-Atlantic Coast Conference (ACC) in his redshirt sophomore season. He suffered a season-ending shoulder injury in the second game of his junior season.

Personal life
Wilson is the younger brother of Major League Baseball pitcher Bryse Wilson.

References

External links
NC State Wolfpack bio

Living people
Players of American football from North Carolina
American football linebackers
NC State Wolfpack football players
People from Hillsborough, North Carolina
Year of birth missing (living people)